Allan John Russell (born 13 December 1980) is a Scottish former professional footballer who was most recently a set-piece coach for  club Norwich City.

Playing career

Scotland and England
Born in Glasgow, Russell began his career in 1999 with Hamilton Academical, making over sixty league appearances over a four-year period. In 2003, Russell began a two-year spell with St Mirren before moving to English side Macclesfield Town in early 2005. Russell's stay at Macclesfield lasted only a few months and he moved on to Mansfield Town at the start of the 2005–06 season.

Russell returned to Scotland with Partick Thistle in January 2007. At Partick he scored once; his goal coming in a 1–0 win over Livingston. Russell began the 2007–08 season with Airdrie, where a December 2007 Player of the Month award and his goalscoring form – by February 2008 he had already scored more than any previous season – attracted interest from Scottish Premier League sides Kilmarnock and Dundee United.

In May 2008, Russell netted the Scottish Football League Second Division Player of the Year award having scored 28 goals in a record breaking season and was eventually signed by Scottish Premier League side Kilmarnock signing a two-year deal. He left Kilmarnock after the expiry of his contract in 2010.

United States
Russell signed for Carolina RailHawks on 23 July 2010. He stayed with the club through the 2011 season winning the 2010 and 2011 NASL league Championships. He then signed with Los Angeles Blues of the USL Pro Division on 8 December 2011, who later changed franchise name to Orange County Blues.

Russell captained Orange County Blues for a time, playing both as a defensive midfielder and as a striker.

Coaching career
In March 2017, Russell joined the England coaching staff as their striker coach. During the 2018 FIFA World Cup, he earned particular praise for his work on the England team's set pieces, after a well-choreographed goal in their game against Panama.

Russell was appointed assistant first team coach at Aberdeen in April 2021, initially combining the role with his England duties. He left his consultancy position with England a month later, after he admitted allowing his younger brother to drive while uninsured.

When Dean Smith was sacked as manager of Championship club Norwich City in December 2022, Russell and the club's Head of Football Development, Steve Weaver were announced as the now co-head coaches on an interim basis a few months after Russell was appointed their set-piece coach, the club's December 2022 statement confirms

References

External links

1980 births
Footballers from Glasgow
Living people
Association football forwards
Scottish footballers
Hamilton Academical F.C. players
St Mirren F.C. players
Macclesfield Town F.C. players
Mansfield Town F.C. players
Forest Green Rovers F.C. players
Partick Thistle F.C. players
Airdrieonians F.C. players
Kilmarnock F.C. players
Scottish Football League players
English Football League players
National League (English football) players
Scottish Premier League players
North Carolina FC players
Orange County SC players
USSF Division 2 Professional League players
North American Soccer League players
USL Championship players
Scottish expatriate footballers
Scottish expatriate sportspeople in the United States
Expatriate soccer players in the United States
Aberdeen F.C. non-playing staff